Amarilson Monteiro (born 26 February 1989), better known as Xolote, is a Cape Verdean professional footballer who plays as a forward for the Cape Verdean club Académica do Porto Novo.

Professional career
Xolote was born in Santo Antão, Cape Verde. He is one of the most prolific strikers in the Santo Antão South Island Championships.

International career
Xolote made his debut for the Cape Verde national football team in a 0-0 (4-3) penalty shootout win over Andorra on 3 June 2018.

Personal life
Xolote studies communication sciences at the Universidade Lusófona.

References

External links
 
 

1989 births
Living people
People from Santo Antão, Cape Verde
Cape Verdean footballers
Cape Verde international footballers
Cape Verdean National Championships players
Association football forwards